Orbatak is a video game developed and published by American Laser Games for the arcade. A 3DO Interactive Multiplayer version was announced but never released.

Gameplay 
Orbatak is a time-based game where the player controls spheres using a track ball to fight other spheres.

Reception 
Next Generation reviewed the arcade version of the game, rating it three stars out of five, and stated that "American Laser Games should be congratulated on Orbatak; it's a refreshing change from the maddening outpour of driving, fighting, and shooting games."

References

External links 
 Orbatak at GameFAQs
 Orbatak at Killer List of Videogames
Two Articles in Cash Box
Article in Play Meter

1994 video games
Action video games
American Laser Games games
Arcade video games
Arcade-only video games
Cancelled 3DO Interactive Multiplayer games
Fantasy sports video games
Trackball video games
Video games developed in the United States